An observatory is a location used for observing terrestrial or celestial events.

Observatory may also refer to:
Observatory, Bristol, a building in Clifton, Bristol, England
Observatory, Cape Town, suburb in Cape Town, South Africa
Observatory, Gauteng, suburb in Johannesburg, South Africa
Observatory (Steve Weingart & Renee Jones album), 2012 album by Steve Weingart & Renee Jones
Observatory (Aeon Station album), 2021 album by Aeon Station
Observatory (horse), thoroughbred race horse
Ratcheugh Observatory, a folly in Northumberland, also known as The Observatory
The Observatory (journal), an astronomy journal
The Observatory (band), an art rock, experimental and electronica band based in Singapore
 The Observatory (album)